Vlora of Albania may refer to:
Zyhdi Efendi Vlora, signatory of Albanian Declaration of Independence
Syrja Vlora, signatory of Albanian Declaration of Independence
 Husband of Helen Margaret Kelly